MS Megastar is a fast ro-ro/passenger (ro-pax) ferry built by the Meyer Turku shipyard in Turku, Finland, for the Estonian shipping company Tallink. The 230 million euro vessel is the first ship in Tallink's fleet to use liquefied natural gas (LNG) as fuel.

Construction 

The construction of Tallink's new car ferry began 4 August 2015 and the keel was laid on 9 February 2016. On 1 July 2016, the ship was given the name Megastar, chosen from 21,550 naming proposals following a public naming contest, by Finnish President Tarja Halonen. The vessel was floated out on 15 July and the sea trials were scheduled for late 2016.  The ship was delivered on 24 January 2017.

Technical details 

Megastar is powered by three 12-cylinder Wärtsilä 12V50DF and two 6-cylinder Wärtsilä 6L50DF four-stroke dual-fuel generating sets. While capable of running on marine diesel oil (MDO), the engines will primarily use liquefied natural gas (LNG) as fuel. This reduces both sulphur oxide (SOx) and nitrogen oxide (NOx) emissions, and allows the vessel to comply with IMO Tier III emission limits as well as the additional restrictions of the Baltic Sea Sulphur Emission Control Area. The gas fuel is stored in two  cryogenic storage tanks which, unlike in the previous LNG-fueled cruiseferry Viking Grace, are located inside the hull of the vessel, below the main deck. The propulsion system is diesel-electric, meaning that instead of being mechanically coupled to the twin propeller shafts, the main engines form a power plant which produces electricity for all electrical consumers ranging from propulsion motors to auxiliary systems and hotel functions. This allows starting and stopping engines depending on power demand and improves the fuel efficiency as the engines can run at their nominal power.

Service history 

After its completion and handover to Tallink the vessel began providing from late January 2017 a six times a day Tallinn-Helsinki-Tallinn service.

References 

2016 ships
Ships built in Turku
Ferries of Estonia